The Supreme Soviet of the Karelo-Finnish SSR (Russian: Верховный Совет Карело-Финской ССР tr. Verkhovnyy Sovet Karelo-Finskoy SSR) was the supreme soviet (main legislative institution) of the Karelo-Finnish SSR. The Supreme Soviet of the Karelo-Finnish SSR was established in June 1940 when the third session of the First Convocation of the Supreme Soviet of the Karelian ASSR adopted the law of transforming the Karelian ASSR into the Karelo-Finnish SSR. The first elections of the Supreme Soviet of the Karelo-Finnish SSR took place on June 16, 1940 and the first session of the first convocation took place on November 8, 1940. The Supreme Soviet of the Karelo-Finnish SSR was disbanded in August of 1956 when the Karelo-Finnish SSR was demoted to an autonomous soviet socialist republic on July 16, 1956.

Convocations 

 1st Convocation of the Supreme Soviet of the Karelo-Finnish SSR (1940-1947)
 2nd Convocation of the Supreme Soviet of the Karelo-Finnish SSR (1947-1951)
 3rd Convocation of the Supreme Soviet of the Karelo-Finnish SSR (1951-1955)
 4th Convocation of the Supreme Soviet of the Karelo-Finnish SSR (1955-1956)

Chairmen of the Supreme Soviet

See also 

 Autonomous Soviet Socialist Republics of the Soviet Union
 Supreme Soviet
 Russian Soviet Federative Socialist Republic

References 

Historical legislatures
1940 establishments in the Soviet Union
1956 disestablishments in the Soviet Union
Karelo-Finnish Soviet Socialist Republic
Defunct unicameral legislatures
Karelo-Finnish